Christopher Fogt (born May 29, 1983) is a United States Army Major, three time USA Olympian, and Olympic Silver medalist. He won a Silver Medal at the 2014 Olympic Games in Sochi as a member of the famed Team Night Train, in the four-man event. He also competed in the two-man Bobsled event in Sochi, earning 12th place with pilot, Cory Butner. He competed in the 2010 Vancouver Games as a member of USA-2, in the four-man event with pilot John Napier. After taking three years off after the 2014 Winter Olympic Games in Sochi, he returned to the Sport in 2017 with long time friend and teammate Steve Langton  earning a spot on his third USA Winter Olympic Team to compete in PyeongChang, 2018. He competed in PyeongChang with pilot Justin Olsen in the four-man event.

Fogt was the 2013 USA Push Champion where he set a push track record with a time of 4.96 seconds in the Canadian Ice House, Calgary. His 2013 Push Championship title beat four-time Push Champion Steve Langton who was in pursuit of his 5th consecutive Push Championship. Due to his dominant performance at the 2013 USA Bobsled Push Championships, Fogt was soon after named to the USA-1 sled, piloted by Steven Holcomb. Chris finished third in the World Push Challenge in 2013, in the Canadian Ice House, Calgary. Leading up to the 2014 Winter Olympic Games Fogt earned two World Cup Gold Medals in the two-man events in Park City, UT and Lake Placid, NY with Pilot Steven Holcomb. Fogt also earned four World Cup Gold Medals in Calgary, Park City, Lake Placid, and Koenigssee in the four-man event with teammates Steve Langton, Curt Tomasevicz, and Steven Holcomb. Fogt, Langton, and Tomasevicz continued to push on the same sled in the 2014 Olympic Winter Games for pilot Steve Holcomb, where they achieved a Silver Medal.

Chris, a resident of Utah, is also a Major in the United States Army and a participant in the U.S. Army World Class Athlete Program. He joined the U.S. Army in 2008 and deployed to Iraq shortly after the Vancouver Games. He returned to active duty following the Sochi Games.  While stationed at Fort Hood, Texas served as the Company Commander for Headquarters and Headquarters Company "Spartans", 3D Engineer Battalion. He returned to bobsledding with qualifying for the 2018 Pyeongchang Games. At the time he graduated Utah Valley University in 2008 he held six school records in Track and Field. He still currently holds the indoor 400M school record with a time of 48.76. While at UVU he posted personal best times of 6.92 in the indoor 60M, 10.53 in the 100M, 21.76 in the indoor 200M, 21.38 in the outdoor 200M, and 34.40 in the indoor 300M.

References

External links

 US Bobsleigh and Skeleton Federation announcement of the US Olympic men's bobsleigh team. January 17, 2010. Accessed January 18, 2010.
 
 
 Personal website
 CBS News
 https://www.teamusa.org/USA-Bobsled-Skeleton-Federation/Athletes/Olympic-Teams/2014-Olympic-Team
 https://www.teamusa.org/USA-Bobsled-Skeleton-Federation/Features/2013/August/01/Fogt-nabs-first-career-Mens-Bobsled-US-National-Push-Championship-title
 https://www.teamusa.org/usa-bobsled-skeleton-federation/athletes/Chris-Fogt
 http://www.espn.com/olympics/winter/2014/bobsled/story/_/id/10506125/2014-sochi-olympics-army-captain-chris-fogt-helps-team-usa-win-four-man-bobsled-bronze
 https://www.teamusa.org/News/2017/February/14/Olympic-Bobsled-Powerhouses-Langton-Fogt-Are-Back-And-Ready-To-Push-Their-Way-To-PyeongChang

1983 births
Living people
American male bobsledders
Bobsledders at the 2010 Winter Olympics
Bobsledders at the 2014 Winter Olympics
Bobsledders at the 2018 Winter Olympics
Utah Valley University alumni
Medalists at the 2014 Winter Olympics
Olympic bronze medalists for the United States in bobsleigh
Sportspeople from Utah
United States Army officers
United States Army personnel of the Iraq War
People from Orange Park, Florida
U.S. Army World Class Athlete Program